Pristidactylus is a genus of lizards from Chile and Argentina.

Species
Pristidactylus contains ten recognized species:
Pristidactylus achalensis (Gallardo, 1964) - Argentine anole
Pristidactylus alvaroi (Donoso-Barros, 1975)
Pristidactylus araucanus (Gallardo, 1964)
Pristidactylus casuhatiensis (Gallardo, 1968) - Casuhatien anole
Pristidactylus fasciatus (d'Orbigny & Bibron, 1837) - D'Orbigny's banded anole
Pristidactylus nigroiugulus Cei, Scolaro & Videla, 2001
Pristidactylus scapulatus (Burmeister, 1861) - Burmeister's anole
Pristidactylus torquatus (Philippi, 1861)
Pristidactylus valeriae (Donoso-Barros, 1966)
Pristidactylus volcanensis Lamborot & Díaz, 1987

Nota bene: A binomial authority in parentheses indicates that the species was originally described in a genus other than Pristidactylus.

References

 
Lizard genera
Taxa named by Leopold Fitzinger